Angela Hunter (born 1972) is a female former British international track and road racing cyclist.

Cycling career
Hunter became a double British champion in 2001 after winning the British National Points Championships and British National Scratch Championships titles at the 2001 British National Track Championships. She repeated this feat the following year winning her third and fourth British titles respectively. In 2003, Angela won Gold in both the British 10 mile and 50 mile time trial Championships.

She represented England in the road race, at the 1998 Commonwealth Games in Kuala Lumpur, Malaysia.

Palmarès
1996
3rd Points, 1996 British National Track Championships

1998
3rd Scratch, 1998 British National Track Championships

2000
2nd Points, 2000 British National Track Championships

2001
1st Scratch, 2001 British National Track Championships
1st Points, 2001 British National Track Championships

2002
1st Scratch, 2002 British National Track Championships
1st Points, 2002 British National Track Championships
2nd Pursuit, 2002 British National Track Championships

2003
1st British National 10 mile Championships
1st British National 50 mile Championships

References

1972 births
Living people
Sportspeople from Manchester
English track cyclists
English female cyclists
Cyclists at the 1998 Commonwealth Games
Commonwealth Games competitors for England